{{Infobox person
| name        = Joseph Muller
| image       =
| caption     =
| birth_name  =
| birth_date  = April 24, 1883
| birth_place = Germany
| death_date  = May 9, 1939
| death_place = Closter, New Jersey
| death_cause =
| other_names =
| known_for   = The Star Spangled Banner: words and music issued between 1814-1864: an annotated bibliographical list with notices of the different versions, texts, variants, musical arrangements, and notes on music publishers in the United States
| education   =
| employer    = J. P. Morgan, New York Public Library
| occupation  =
| title       =
| height      =
| term        =
| predecessor =
| successor   =
| party       =
| boards      =
| spouse      =
| partner     =
| children    =
| parents     =
| relatives   =
| signature   =
| website     =
| footnotes   =
| nationality = Germany, United States
}}
Joseph Muller (April 24, 1883—May 9, 1939) was a musician, artist, author, researcher, collector and world traveler. Known as a specialist in American music who worked for the New York Public Library, he amassed a personal collection of several thousand engravings and lithographs.  Upon his death, his collection was donated to the Music Division of the New York Public Library.

Biography
Born in Germany, his desire for travel led him to become a sailor. He was a steward on private yachts (including one owned by J. P. Morgan) and visited many countries. Through his travels he became knowledgeable in music and a collector.

In 1930 he left Morgan's employ and became a staff member of the Music Division of the New York Public Library, specializing in American music. He held that position until his death. While at the Library he formalized the Music Division's Iconography collection and became its first curator.

Muller's main interest was in 19th century American music. He was known for his book Bibliography of Francis Scott Key's 'The Star Spangled Banner'' and for his portraits of classical musicians. He was an authority on Stephen Foster and lent his skills to the Foster Hall archive, now known as the Stephen Foster Collection and archive. An amateur artist, many of Muller's drawings of people and localities associated with Foster are now part of that collection. Muller's portrait of Stephen Foster was the basis of the U.S. postal stamp first issued in Bardstown, Kentucky on May 3, 1940.

He sold his collection of materials related to the Star Spangled Banner (consisting of about 200 items) to the Library of Congress.

At the time of his death he was living in Closter, New Jersey.

Publications

References

Sources

External links
Joseph Muller collection of music and other portraits (fully digitized)
Joseph Muller Drawings (collection of drawings by Joseph Muller in the Music Division of The New York Public Library for the Performing Arts

1883 births
1939 deaths
People from Closter, New Jersey
American collectors
New York Public Library people
German emigrants to the United States